is a Japanese light novel series written by kiki and illustrated by kinta. It began serialization as a web novel published on the user-generated novel publishing website Shōsetsuka ni Narō in January 2018. Micro Magazine later acquired the series, which began releasing it in print in July 2018 under their GC Novels imprint. The light novel has been licensed for an English-language release by Seven Seas Entertainment.

A manga adaptation with art by Sunao Minakata has been serialized online via Micro Magazine's Comic Ride website since December 27, 2018. The 
manga has also been licensed for an English-language release by Seven Seas Entertainment.

Plot 
Flum Apricot is born with a unique Affinity known as "Reversal" that leaves her with zero stats across the board. However after being prophesied by the God Origin to join the Hero’s party and defeat the Demon Lord, Flum finds herself with what seems like an impossible task. Things only get harder when the party’s renowned sage, Jean Inteige, decides to sell her into slavery instead. After being thrown to ghouls for master’s entertainment with nothing but a cursed sword, Flum finally learns the true meaning of her unique "Reversal" Affinity.

Media

Light novels 
Roll Over and Die: I Will Fight for an Ordinary Life with My Love and Cursed Sword!''' first began serialization online on the user-generated novel publishing website Shōsetsuka ni Narō in January 2018. Micro Magazine later acquired the series, which began releasing it in print in June 2018 under their GC Novels imprint. Seven Seas Entertainment licensed the light novels for English-language release in 2020.

 Manga 
A manga adaptation is written by kiki, illustrated by Sunao Minakata, and with character designs provided by Kinta. It began serialization in Micro Magazine's Comic Ride website on December 27, 2018. It has been also licensed for an English-language release by Seven Seas Entertainment.

 Reception Roll Over and Die'' has received generally positive reviews. Anime News Network giving the first volume an overall B+ grade, with Theron Martin praising the quality of its writing and storytelling when compared of other light novels, though noting that the game mechanics-based setting felt like a crutch. Erica Friedman of Yuricon noted in her review that the series lacks nuance in its writing when dealing with the subjects of violence against women and slavery throughout.

References

External links 
  at Shōsetsuka ni Narō 
  
  
 
 

2010s LGBT literature
2018 Japanese novels
Action anime and manga
Anime and manga based on light novels
Dark fantasy anime and manga
LGBT in anime and manga
Light novels
Light novels first published online
Seinen manga
Seven Seas Entertainment titles
Shōsetsuka ni Narō
Yuri (genre) anime and manga
Yuri (genre) light novels